Mechtild of Guelders (c. 1324 – 1384, in Huissen) was the ruling suo jure Countess of Kleve from 1347 to 1368, and the suo jure Duchess of Guelders from 1371 to 1379, after succeeding her father, Reginald II, Duke of Guelders.

References 

1324 births
1384 deaths
14th-century women rulers
Dukes of Guelders